James Alexander Loggie (June 27, 1862 – June 30, 1936) was an American politician in the state of Washington. He served in the Washington House of Representatives from 1895 to 1897.

References

Republican Party members of the Washington House of Representatives
1862 births
1936 deaths
Canadian emigrants to the United States